Bao Yixin (born 29 September 1992) is a Chinese badminton doubles player. She won titles in the women's doubles category with many different partners. She won two World Junior titles at the 2010 BWF World Junior Championships held in Guadalajara, Mexico. In the girls' doubles event, she was crowned World Junior Champion with Ou Dongni and in the mixed doubles she was crowned with Liu Cheng. She also won the mixed doubles at the 2009 Asian Junior Championships with Lu Kai and the mixed doubles at the 2010 Asian Junior Championships with Liu Cheng. Partnering with Tang Yuanting, Bao became the women's doubles champion at the 2015 All England Open. Bao graduated with a bachelor's degree from Xiangtan University.

Career 
Bao Yixin  started to playing badminton when she was child at the age of 6, and began to receive a formal training at the age of 8. She was selected in to the national team when she was 14, playing in the doubles discipline.

Women's doubles
In 2010, Bao Yixin reached the women's doubles final of the China Masters with Lu Lu. Ath the age of 19, she first won the 2011 Japan Open with Zhong Qianxin and the Canada Open Grand Prix with Cheng Shu. One year later, the couple Bao  and Zhong won the 2012 Singapore Open and the China Masters back to back. They also reached the final of the 2012 Swiss Open losing to compatriots Xia Huan and Tang Jinhua and the final of the 2012 India Open losing to the Korean pair of Jung Kyung-eun & Kim Ha-na. The couple of Bao Yixin and Zhong Qianxin reached the number 2 spot on the BWF World Ranking for women's doubles in January 2013. They lost the final of the 2013 China Open at home to compatriots Wang Xiaoli and Yu Yang.

Before this, early in 2013, Bao Yixin paired up with Tian Qing to win the 2013 Malaysia Open. Later in the month June 2013, Bao Yixin teamed up again with Cheng Shu to win the 2013 Indonesia Open final in a close fought battle against teammates Tian Qing & Zhao Yunlei 21–17, 22–20. One month later in July 2013, Bao teamed up with Zhong Qianxin again to this time win the 2013 U.S. Open. She also reached the quarter finales of the World Championships with Zhong in August of the same year.

For the last quarter of 2013, Bao Yixin was paired up with a new partner again. This time it was Tang Jinhua and this would become an instant success winning five big women's doubles events in the last part of the year 2013. There were victories at the finals of the Dutch Open, Denmark Open, French Open, Hong Kong Open and the Macau Open. Of the first 28 matches played this new couple only lost one match. In 2014, Bao and Tang won the Korea Open, Malaysia Open, Swiss Open and the Singapore Open. She was also part of the Chinese Uber Cup winning team in 2014. Together with women's doubles partner Tang Jinhua she reached the number one spot of the BWF World Ranking on 29 May 2014.

In March 2015, she won the All England Open Badminton Championships in women's doubles with her partner Tang Yuanting, defeating the defending champions Wang Xiaoli and Yu Yang.

Mixed doubles
Bao Yixin and her partner Liu Cheng reached the final of the 2013 Hong Kong Open in mixed doubles. One year earlier, she had already reached the final of the 2012 French Open with Qiu Zihan, narrowly losing in three games to Xu Chen and Ma Jin (17–21, 21–19, 18–21). Her biggest victory to date in the mixed doubles event was winning the 2011 Indonesia Open Grand Prix Gold with He Hanbin after opponents Xu Chen and Ma Jin had to retire with injury in the second game of the final (21–19, 1–4). After two semi-finals at the Swiss and the Singapore Opens Bao Yixin and Liu Cheng received a bronze medal at the 2014 BWF World Championships in Copenhagen, Denmark by reaching another semi-final.

Retirement
Bao announced her retirement through her social media account on 11 September 2017. After retired, she continue her law degree in Xiangtan University in Hunan, and then moved to study English in Sydney, Australia. She also teaching badminton in a local club in Sydney in her spare time.

Personal life 
Bao Yixin is married to her former partner in mixed doubles Liu Cheng.

Achievements

BWF World Championships 
Mixed doubles

Asian Championships 
Women's doubles

BWF World Junior Championships 
Girls' doubles

Mixed doubles

Asian Junior Championships 
Girls' doubles

Mixed doubles

BWF Superseries 
The BWF Superseries, which was launched on 14 December 2006 and implemented in 2007, is a series of elite badminton tournaments, sanctioned by the Badminton World Federation (BWF). BWF Superseries levels are Superseries and Superseries Premier. A season of Superseries consists of twelve tournaments around the world that have been introduced since 2011. Successful players are invited to the Superseries Finals, which are held at the end of each year.

Women's doubles

Mixed doubles

  BWF Superseries Finals tournament
  BWF Superseries Premier tournament
  BWF Superseries tournament

BWF Grand Prix 
The BWF Grand Prix had two levels, the BWF Grand Prix and Grand Prix Gold. It was a series of badminton tournaments sanctioned by the Badminton World Federation (BWF) which was held from 2007 to 2017.

Women's doubles

Mixed doubles

  BWF Grand Prix Gold tournament
  BWF Grand Prix tournament

References

External links 

 

1992 births
Living people
People from Zhuzhou
Badminton players from Hunan
Chinese female badminton players
Badminton players at the 2014 Asian Games
Asian Games gold medalists for China
Asian Games medalists in badminton
Medalists at the 2014 Asian Games
World No. 1 badminton players
Chinese emigrants to Australia
Chinese badminton coaches
21st-century Chinese women